The 2017 mayoral election in Birmingham, Alabama, took place on August 22, 2017, alongside municipal races for the Birmingham City Council and Birmingham Board of Education. In a field of twelve candidates, Randall Woodfin came in first ahead of incumbent William A. Bell. As neither reached the 50 percent threshold, a runoff election was held on October 3, 2017, when Woodfin was elected with over 58 percent of the vote.

Results

References

2017 United States mayoral elections
2017 Alabama elections
2017